SWU (Starts With You, or "Começa Com Você" - CCV, in Portuguese) is originally a Brazilian sustainability movement, which organised the rock music festival SWU Music & Arts Festival. The festival had its first edition in October 2010. It was a three-day-long festival that had many important national and international musical acts including Megadeth, Avenged Sevenfold, Linkin Park, Kings of Leon, Queens of the Stone Age and Rage Against the Machine. It took place in the Arena Maeda in Itu on October 9, 10 and 11, 2010. Arena Maeda is actually a farm, which hosts many events because of its good terrain and location. The event also had most of its main concerts recorded and broadcast live on international television.

The second edition took place in Paulínia on November 12, 13 and 14, 2011. The festival has not been held since.

SWU Music & Arts Festival 2010
The concerts took place in four different stages: Ar (air), Água (water), Heineken Greenspace and Oi Novo Som (Oi New Sound). Act names in Bold are Headliners.

Line-up

1Late night performances after the headliners by various DJ's.
2Every night one independent band winner of the "Battle of Bands Oi Novo Som Contest" performed after the headliners.

SWU Music & Arts Festival 2011

Less than two days after the end of the 2010 edition, it was posted in the festival's official Facebook page that there would be a 2011 version of the festival. There is an official page of the festival's website in its Brazilian version, where it is asked for opinions and suggestion for the 2011 festival. On 3 June 2011, it was confirmed by the Brazilian edition of the Portuguese broadsheet newspaper Destak that the festival will be held at a new venue. While organizers have yet to finalize details, it was speculated that the event may be held at the São Paulo municipality of Paulínia.

References

External links 
 

2010 in Brazil
2010 in music
Benefit concerts
Environmental organisations based in Brazil
Music festivals in Brazil
Electronic music festivals in Brazil
Music festivals established in 2010